Popeye domain-containing protein 2 is a protein that in humans is encoded by the POPDC2 gene.

Structure 
This gene encodes a member of the POP family of proteins which contain three putative transmembrane domains. This membrane associated protein is predominantly expressed in skeletal and cardiac muscle. The Popeye domain, which is located in the cytoplasmic part of the protein displays limited sequence homology to other proteins, while sequence conservation amongst Popeye proteins is high and amounts to approximately 40%–60%.

Function 
The bacterial CAP or CRP proteins are the closest related non-Popdcproteins. CRP proteins function as cyclic nucleotide-regulated transcription factors that modulate the expression of genes encoding enzymes involved in carbohydrate metabolism. The cyclic AMP-binding domains of these proteins display approximately 25% identity and 60% similarity to the Popeye domain. Significant structural similarity is evident between the Popeye domain and cAMP binding domains of eukaryotic protein kinase A (PKA) and HCN channels.

Ligands 
The Popeye domain binds cyclic nucleotides and has a binding affinity (IC50) for cAMP of 120 nM, which is comparable to the affinities reported for PKA (100 nM) and HCN4 (240 nM). One of the interacting proteins is the two-pore potassium (K2P) channel TREK-1. In the presence of Popdc proteins, TREK-1 current is increased. This increase was based on an enhanced membrane representation of TREK-1, suggesting a modulation of channel trafficking by Popdc proteins.

Animal studies 
Genetic inactivation of Popdc2 in mice resulted in bradyarrhythmia, which is strictly stress-dependent. At rest a normal ECG was observed. Gene inactivation in the zebrafish also causes a cardiac arrhythmia phenotype and defective skeletal muscle development.

References